The Portuguese Roller Sports Federation is the governing body for roller sports, such as rink hockey, Inline hockey, figure skating, speed skating in Portugal.

Honours
Roller Hockey World Cup: 16
 1947, 1948, 1949, 1950, 1952, 1956, 1958, 1960, 1962, 1968, 1974, 1982, 1991, 1993, 2003, 2019
Eurocup: 21
 1947, 1948, 1949, 1950, 1952, 1956, 1959, 1961, 1963, 1965, 1967, 1971, 1973, 1975, 1977, 1987, 1992, 1994, 1996, 1998, 2016
Nations Cup: 18
 1948, 1949, 1954, 1955, 1956, 1963, 1965, 1968, 1970, 1973, 1984, 1987, 1994, 1997, 2009, 2011, 2013, 2015
Latin Cup: 14
 1957, 1959, 1960, 1961, 1962, 1988, 1989, 1998, 2001, 2002, 2003, 2008, 2014, 2016
World Games: 4
 1981, 1989, 1993, 2001
U20 World Cup: 3
 2003, 2013, 2015
Women's Eurocup: 3
 1997, 1999, 2001

References

External links
 

Roller hockey in Portugal
Roller Sports